Dana Matthew Veth (born 1 September 1987 in Nassau) is a Bahamian former footballer.

Early life
Veth was born in the Bahamas but has dual American-Bahamian citizenship. His father is from Minnesota, his mother is Bahamian.

Club career
He played one season for the Bowling Green Falcons, then transferred to UW-Green Bay in the off season. The following year he teamed up with the UMM Cougars in 2007. Veth also worked at the 2010 Total Performance Soccer Camp in Minnesota.

International career
When still at Blaine High School, Veth earned a call-up to the Bahamas U-20 team.

Veth made his debut for the Bahamas in a March 2008 World Cup qualification match against the British Virgin Islands. He also played in the return match, making it two caps in total, scoring no goals.

In 2011, Veth joined the national team once again to compete in preliminary World Cup qualifying rounds. As captain, he led the team to two victories over Turks and Caicos Islands national football team. Even though the team earned a place to advance, the country decided to opt out of further competition, ending their World Cup run.

Coaching career
In September 2010 was named as the Assistant coach of the Spring Hill Badgers Women Soccer team.

References

1987 births
Living people
Sportspeople from Nassau, Bahamas
Bahamian footballers
Bahamas international footballers
Bowling Green Falcons men's soccer players
Expatriate soccer players in the United States
Association football defenders
University of Minnesota Morris alumni